Old Centralians Rugby Football Club is an English rugby union club based at Saintbridge Sports Center in Gloucester. The club operates three senior sides with the first XV playing in South West Premier, a level five league in the English rugby union league system.  The club was founded in 1937 as Old Centralians but changed its name in 1970/80's to Saintbridge Former Pupils before reverting to Old Centralians during the 1990s.

Honours
1st team:
 Gloucester 2 champions: 1995–96
 Gloucester 1 champions: 1997–98
 Gloucester/Somerset champions: 1999–00
 Gloucester Premier v Somerset Premier play-off winners: 2000–01
 North Gloucestershire Combination Senior Cup winners (4): 2011–12, 2014–15, 2016–17, 2017–18
 Tribute Western Counties (north v west) promotion play-off winners: 2011–12
 South West 1 (east v west) promotion play-off winners: 2012–13
 South West 1 East champions: 2019–20

2nd team:
 North Gloucestershire Combination Junior Cup winners (4): 1964–65, 2000–01, 2012–13, 2016–17

3rd team:
 North Gloucestershire Combination Glanville Cup winners: 2012–13

References

External links
 Official club website

1982 establishments in England
English rugby union teams
Rugby clubs established in 1982
Sport in Gloucester
Rugby union in Gloucestershire